Adolf Valentin "Adi" Lindfors (8 February 1879 – 5 May 1959) was a heavyweight Greco-Roman wrestler from Finland. He competed at the 1912, where we became injured and had to withdraw, and 1920 Olympics, where he won a gold medal, aged 41. 

Lindfors started seriously training in sports around 1900, and won Finnish titles in weightlifting in 1903–04 and in Greco-Roman wrestling in 1905, 1910 and 1913. He placed second at the 1911 World Championships. Back in 1902 he founded Porvoon Akilles and headed it from 1902 to 1912.

References

External links
 

1879 births
1959 deaths
Olympic wrestlers of Finland
Wrestlers at the 1912 Summer Olympics
Wrestlers at the 1920 Summer Olympics
Finnish male sport wrestlers
Olympic gold medalists for Finland
Olympic medalists in wrestling
Medalists at the 1920 Summer Olympics
People from Porvoo
World Wrestling Championships medalists
Sportspeople from Uusimaa
19th-century Finnish people
20th-century Finnish people